Echinopsis terscheckii, commonly known as the cardon grande cactus or Argentine saguaro, is a large cactus native to South America and popular in cultivation.

Description
Branches are cylindrical, fleshy, light green. The branches are  10-20 cm in diameter, with 8-14 blunt ribs. Pericarp and flower tube with dense white or brown axillary hairs.

Native distribution
It is native to several provinces including Jujuy, Tucumán, La Rioja, San Juan, Catamarca and Salta provinces in northwestern Argentina, and is the eponymous cactus of Los Cardones National Park in Salta Province.  Range continues to the western slopes of the Andes in Peru, Bolivia department of Tarija, and Ecuador. It is found growing on dry slopes of the Andean foothills at altitudes of 500 to 1500 meters.

Taxonomy
This species was first describe as Cereus terscheckii by Ludwig Georg Karl Pfeiffer was published in 1837. Heimo Friedrich and Gordon Douglas Rowley placed the species in the genus Echinopsis in 1974.

Alkaloids
Echinopsis terscheckii contains > 0.005-0.025% mescaline in fresh cactus and 0.01%-2.375% mescaline in dry weight.

References

 http://www.delange.org/CardonGrande/CardonGrande.htm 
Trichocereus terscheckii (J.Parm. ex Pfeiff.) Britton & Rose Plants of the World Online

External links

terscheckii